Agamenon: The Film is a 2012 Brazilian comedy film directed by Victor Lopes. It stars Marcelo Adnet, Luana Piovani, Fernanda Montenegro, Hubert, and Cláudio Tovar.

References

External links
 

2012 films
2012 comedy films
2010s Portuguese-language films
Brazilian comedy films